Michelle Ye or Ye Xuan (born 14 February 1980) is a Chinese actress and producer. She is best known for her roles in, Eternal Happiness, Triumph in the Skies, and Lost in the Chamber of Love.
Her most notable role was in the 2009 film Accident, in which she won the 2010 Hong Kong Film Award for Best Supporting Actress.

Ye has worked as an on-site reporter for TVB at the Olympic Games in Athens in 2004. In 1999, she won the Miss Chinese International competition.

Apart from her acting career, she is the owner and chairman of the production company Michelle Ye Studios-Zhejiang Bohai Television Ltd, an owner of a sushi restaurant, and the Vice President of the Hengdian Film Association.

Early life
Michelle Ye was born in Hangzhou, China. She was named after her mother's favorite actress Zhou Xuan. Ye's mother was a housewife and her father a lawyer. Her father was constantly on business travel, thus leaving Ye to be cared for by her mother solely. When Ye was seven years old, her father moved overseas and only returned home for a total number of weeks within a year. Ye's parents divorced when she was nine years old. Her mother no longer wanted to care for her and instead wanted Ye's father to know what it was like to take care of their child.

Ye then lived with her paternal grandparents. Her grandparents were retired professors who lived in a professor's hostel in the university. She was loved and spoiled by her grandparents, but her grandfather was extremely strict with her academics. Under his guidance, her academic results were good. Ye was involved in a lot of school activities.

At the age of 10, her father brought her grandparents and Ye to New York City. Ye's father told her that a man's career is first priority and bringing her to the States would allow her to have a better education. Ye's grandparents could not acclimate to the new environment and returned to China. Her father was still busy with his career. She stated that initially she did hate her father. At the age of 13, Ye suggested to move out, claiming she did not want to live with a stranger. Her father agreed and let her rent an apartment. Every month she would go to her father's company for spending money. She would take care of laundry and meals herself. To earn extra money for other expenses, she lied about her age to work in a video rental store. Whilst at the store, she would often rent numerous series and movies to watch, which eventually influenced her to work in the entertainment business.

She attended John Dewey High School. While there, she learned to speak Cantonese from a classmate. She won first place at the International Science and Engineering Fair in the Botany sector in 1998. She was the valedictorian of her class, thus earning her full scholarship to the prestigious Wellesley College, where she majored in political science.

Ye is fluent in Cantonese, English, and Mandarin.

She was influenced by her stepmother to enter the 1998 Miss Greater Chinatown NYC beauty pageant. She was 2nd runner up, but the winner resigned and the 1st runner up declined the title. She accepted the title and competed in Hong Kong for the Miss Chinese International 1999 competition on her birthday and won. After the competition, she went back and finished her first year of college. After further consideration, Ye decided not to continue her studies, but instead signed a contract with TVB. Her previous aspiration was to become a lawyer.

Career
In July 1999, she signed a contract with TVB. At the beginning of her career, Michelle Ye was well promoted by her company. She starred in several series and eventually earned "Fa Dan" status.

Ye's most notable friends in the business are Myolie Wu and Rain Lau, in which they became sworn sisters after filming Eternal Happiness.

Ye was rumored to have dated several men, but among all of them, she only admitted to dating Benny Chan. Chan and Ye first worked together on the set of Gods of Honour. It was not until filming Network Love Story in China that they started to date. They dated for two years and allegedly split due to personality differences.

After Jessica Hsuan was unable to film World's Finest, Hsuan recommended Ye to take the role as "Hai Tang". Director Wong Jing took notice of Ye and eventually offered her a contract with Rich & Famous Talent Management Group Limited, the same company that manages Shu Qi, Anthony Wong, Edison Chen, Denise Ho, etc.

Ye's contract with TVB, which she did not renew, ended in June 2005. Instead, she accepted the contract with Rich & Famous Talent Management Group Limited a month later in the hope of landing big screen roles. Ye continues to gain recognition from renowned directors, such as Dante Lam and Johnnie To. She won the 2010 Hong Kong Film Awards for Best Supporting Actress. In 2008, Ye renewed her contract with Rich & Famous Talent Management Group Limited.

Other projects 
Ye published an autobiography titled Shang Shan Ruo Shui - Xuan Gong Lue in July 2006.

In 2011, Ye established her own production company (Michelle Ye Studios-Zhejiang Bohai Television Ltd) and has produced and starred in three series thus far, Ninth Widow, Athena, and Purple Hairpin. However, Ye has not ruled out a return to TVB after revealing she was recently asked to do so by several producers. In 2012, Ye was voted Vice President of the Hengdian Film Association and on the side, opened a sushi restaurant in Hengdian.

Awards and nominations
(1998) Won second runner up in the "Miss Greater Chinatown NYC beauty pageant 1998" 
(1999) Crowned first place as Miss Chinese International Pageant 1999
(1999) Won "Miss Classic Beauty" Award in the "Miss Chinese International 1999"
(2002) Nominated as "Most Improved Actress" for TVB 35th Anniversary Awards
(2002) Nominated as "Favorite Partnership" with Raymond Lam for TVB 35th Anniversary Awards
(2003) Nominated as "Most Improved Actress" for TVB 36th Anniversary Awards
(2003) Nominated as "Favorite Actress" for TVB 36th Anniversary Awards
(2003) Nominated as "Favorite Partnership" with Raymond Lam and Kenneth Ma for TVB 36th Anniversary Awards
(2005) Nominated as "Best Newcomer" in Hong Kong Golden Horse Award for Moonlight in Tokyo
(2009) Nominated as "The Best Leading Actress" in The 66th Venice Film Festival for Accident
(2010) Won "Best Supporting Actress" in 29th Hong Kong Film Awards for Accident
(2011) Won "Hong Kong and Taiwan's Most Popular Actress of the Year" in LeTV Entertainment Awards

Filmography

Film

Television

Pageant history
Michelle Ye was originally 2nd runner up at the 1998 pageant, but the winner and 1st runner up did not want to compete in Hong Kong. She took over the crown and title. She later on represented New York at Miss Chinese International 1999 where she won.

References

External links

Michelle Ye's Sina weibo
Michelle Ye's Autobiography/Shang Shan Ruo Shui - Xuan Gong Lue

1980 births
Living people
American emigrants to Hong Kong
Chinese emigrants to the United States
Actresses from Zhejiang
Hong Kong film actresses
Hong Kong television actresses
Miss Chinese International winners
Actresses from Hangzhou
John Dewey High School alumni
Wellesley College alumni
American autobiographers
Writers from New York (state)
Women autobiographers
Hong Kong women writers
20th-century Hong Kong actresses
21st-century Hong Kong actresses
Chinese film actresses
Chinese television actresses
20th-century Chinese actresses
21st-century Chinese actresses
American women non-fiction writers